Mario Cesar Quintero Padron (10 January 1924 – 26 January 2017) was a Cuban basketball player who competed in the 1948 Summer Olympics and in the 1952 Summer Olympics.

Career
Quintero coached the national team at the 1959 Pan American Games and 1967 Pan American Games, as well as qualified for the 1968 Summer Olympics. He became an international referee in 1953.

Quintero died in Colón on the 26th of January 2017.

References

1924 births
2017 deaths
People from Colón, Cuba
Cuban men's basketball players
Olympic basketball players of Cuba
Basketball players at the 1948 Summer Olympics
Basketball players at the 1952 Summer Olympics
Basketball players at the 1951 Pan American Games
Pan American Games competitors for Cuba
Competitors at the 1946 Central American and Caribbean Games 
Competitors at the 1950 Central American and Caribbean Games 
Central American and Caribbean Games bronze medalists for Cuba
Central American and Caribbean Games medalists in basketball
20th-century Cuban people
21st-century Cuban people